Max or Maxwell Ward may refer to:

Max Ward (aviator), Canadian aviator and founder of Wardair air lines
Max Ward (drummer), American drummer and founder of 625 Thrashcore Records
Maxwell Ward, 6th Viscount Bangor, Irish peer and politician
Maxwell Ward (cricketer), Australian cricketer
Maxwell Ward (contestant), Big Brother contestant